The CEV Champions League was the highest level of European club volleyball in the 2016–17 season and the 57th edition. The Turkish club VakıfBank Istanbul won its third title and qualified to the 2017 FIVB Club World Championship as European champion, besides being already invited by the FIVB, along with Eczacıbaşı VitrA and Voléro Zürich. The Italian club Imoco Volley Conegliano won the silver medal and Turkish Eczacıbaşı VitrA claimed the bronze medal. The Chinese Zhu Ting from VakıfBank Istanbul was awarded Most Valuable Player. Fourth placed club, Dinamo Moscow later received the last wild card to the Club World Championship by the FIVB.

Qualification

A total of 16 team participate of the main competition, with 12 teams being allocated direct vacancies on the basis of ranking list for European Cup Competitions and 4 teams qualified from the qualification rounds.

1.Team qualified via Champions League qualification round.

Format
League round
A round-robin format (each team plays every other team in its pool twice, once home and once away) where 16 teams were drawn to 4 pools of 4 teams each.

The standings is determined by the number of matches won.
In case of a tie in the number of matches won by two or more teams, their ranking is based on the following criteria:
result points (points awarded for results: 3 points for 3–0 or 3–1 wins, 2 points for 3–2 win, 1 point for 2–3 loss);
set quotient (the number of total sets won divided by the number of total sets lost);
points quotient (the number of total points scored divided by the number of total points lost);
results of head-to-head matches between the teams in question.

Playoffs
A knockout format where the 6 qualified teams are each draw into one of the 3 matches with each match consisting of two legs (home and away).
Result points are awarded for each leg (3 points for 3–0 or 3–1 wins, 2 points for 3–2 win, 1 point for 2–3 loss). The Golden Set winner is the team that first obtains 15 points, provided that the points difference between the two teams is at least 2 points (thus, the Golden Set is similar to a tiebreak set in a normal match).

Final Four
A single-elimination format where the three winners of the Playoffs are joined by the Final Four hosts and draw to play the semifinals (winners advance to the final and losers to the 3rd place match). In case two teams from the same country qualify for the semifinals, they will play each other.

Pools composition
Drawing of lots was held in Rome, Italy on 9 June 2016.

Squads

League round

All times are local.

Pool A

|}

|}

Pool B

|}

|}

Pool C

|}

|}

Pool D

|}

|}

Playoffs
Drawing of lots was held in Luxembourg City, Luxembourg on 3 March 2017.
All times are local.

Playoff 6

|}

First leg

|}

Second leg

|}

Final four
Organizer:  Imoco Volley Conegliano
Venue: PalaVerde, Treviso, Italy
All times are Central European Summer Time (UTC+02:00).
In case that two teams from the same country qualify for the semifinals, they will have to play each other.

Semifinals

|}

3rd place match

|}

Final

|}

Final standing

Awards

Most Valuable Player
  Zhu Ting (VakıfBank Istanbul)
Best Setter
  Naz Aydemir (VakıfBank Istanbul)
Best Outside Spikers
  Kelsey Robinson (Imoco Volley Conegliano)
  Kimberly Hill (VakıfBank Istanbul)

Best Middle Blockers
  Milena Rasic (VakıfBank Istanbul)
  Rachael Adams (Eczacıbaşı VitrA)
Best Opposite Spiker
  Lonneke Sloetjes (VakıfBank Istanbul)
Best Libero
  Monica De Gennaro (Imoco Volley Conegliano)

References

External links

Official website

CEV Women's Champions League
CEV Women's Champions League
CEV Women's Champions League